Senator Ring may refer to:

Jeremy Ring (born 1970), Florida State Senate
Merritt Clarke Ring (1850–1915), Wisconsin State Senate
Twyla Ring (born 1937), Minnesota State Senate